Coptops hypocrita is a species of beetle in the family Cerambycidae. It was described by Lameere in 1892.

References

hypocrita
Beetles described in 1892